
Consort Lu may refer to:

Consorts with the surname Lu
 Lu Huinan (412–466), concubine of Emperor Wen of Liu Song
 Empress Lu (Liu Song dynasty) ( 465), wife of Emperor Qianfei of Liu Song
 Empress Lu (Tang dynasty) ( 710), wife of Emperor Shang of Tang
 Imperial Noble Consort Qinggong (1724–1774), concubine of the Qianlong Emperor

Consorts with the surname Lü
 Lü Zhi (241–180 BC), wife of Emperor Gaozu of Han
 Empress Lü (Houshao) (died 180 BC), wife of Emperor Houshao of Han

Consorts with the title Consort Lu
Consort Lu (Xianfeng) (1841–1895), concubine of the Xianfeng Emperor

See also
 Lu Lingxuan (died 577), powerful lady-in-waiting in the palace of Northern Qi
 Consort Yujiulü (disambiguation), Yujiulü's sinicized name being Lü